Kevin Mark Ireland  (born 18 July 1933) is a New Zealand poet, short story writer, novelist and librettist.

Life
Born in Auckland, in 1959 Ireland headed for London where he remained for twenty-five years (with the interlude of a short interval in Bulgaria, translating Bulgarian poetry into English); for two decades, Ireland was employed by The Times.

In 1986, Ireland was writer-in-residence at Canterbury University; in 1987, he was the Grimshaw-Sargeson Fellowship; in 1989, he was the University of Auckland's writing fellow, assistant editor of Quote Unquote, and president of PEN, 1990–91.

Family
Ireland's second wife was Phoebe Caroline Dalwood (1940-2007); Ireland has two stepsons. He lives in Devonport, New Zealand. He was married in 2012 to Professor Janet Mary Wilson.

Honours and awards
 1979 – New Zealand Book Award for Poetry for Literary Cartoons
 1990 – New Zealand 1990 Commemoration Medal
 1992 – Appointed an Officer of the Order of the British Empire, for services to literature, in the 1992 Queen's Birthday Honours
 2000 – Conferred with an honorary Doctor of Literature degree by Massey University
 2004 – Prime Minister's Awards for Literary Achievement

Works

Short Stories

Novels

Editor

Memoirs

References

External links
"Kevin Ireland", New Zealand Electronic Poetry Centre
Interview with Kevin Ireland for Cultural Icons project. Audio.
Profile, natlib.govt.nz; accessed 23 September 2015.

1933 births
Living people
New Zealand poets
New Zealand male poets
People from Auckland
New Zealand Officers of the Order of the British Empire